Tallapudi mandal is one of the 19 mandals in the East Godavari district of the Indian state of Andhra Pradesh. It is administered under the Kovvur revenue division.

References 

Mandals in East Godavari district